is a Japanese form of short poetry similar to haiku in construction: three lines with 17  (or , often translated as syllables, but see the article on  for distinctions).  tend to be about human foibles while haiku tend to be about nature, and  are often cynical or darkly humorous while haiku are more serious.

Form and content
 is named after Edo period  poet , whose collection  launched the genre into the public consciousness. A typical example from the collection:

English-language  publications
In the 1970s, Michael McClintock edited Seer Ox: American Senryu Magazine. In 1993, Michael Dylan Welch edited and published Fig Newtons:  to Go, the first anthology of English-language .
Failed Haiku is edited by Mike Rehling and Bryan Rickert.
Simply Haiku archives (final publication in 2009) contain a regular  column edited by Alan Pizzarelli.

Additionally, one can regularly find  and related articles in some haiku publications. For example, the World Haiku Review has regularly published .  regularly appear or appeared in the pages of Modern Haiku, Frogpond, Bottle Rockets, Woodnotes, Tundra, Haiku Canada Review, Presence, Blithe Spirit, Kingfisher, and other haiku journals, often unsegregated from haiku.

awards
The Haiku Society of America holds the annual Gerald Brady Memorial Award for best unpublished .

Since about 1990, the Haiku Poets of Northern California has been running a  contest, as part of its San Francisco International Haiku and Senryu Contest.

See also

References

Bibliography and further reading
 J C Brown, Senryu: Poems of the People, Simon & Schuster Ltd, 1991, 
R. H. Blyth, translator, Senryu: Japanese Satirical Verses. 1949, The Hokuseido Press, . Includes black and white sketches and some colored plates
R. H. Blyth, translator, Japanese Humour. 1957, Japan Travel Bureau
R. H. Blyth, translator, Japanese Life and Character in Senryu. 1960, The Hokuseido Press
R. H. Blyth, translator, Oriental Humour. 1960, The Hokuseido Press
R. H. Blyth, translator, Edo Satirical Verse Anthologies. 1961, The Hokuseido Press
Robin D. Gill, compiler and translator, Octopussy, Dry Kidney & Blue Spots – dirty themes from 18-19c Japanese poems, Paraverse Press, 2007. . Chronicles 1,300  – Blyth mentioned that he could only introduce what the censors allowed; these are the type of  that were not allowed.
Lorraine Ellis Harr (tombo), Selected Senryu. 1976, J & C Transcripts. One of the earliest English-language -only publications
James Day Hodgson, American Senryu. 1992, The Japan Times, 
Howard S. Levy and Junko Ohsawa, One Hundred Senryu Selections. 1979, So. Pasadena, CA, Langstaff Publications, 
Alan Pizzarelli, Senryu Magazine. 2001, River Willow. Although this book looks like a regular journal, it is the effort of Alan Pizzarelli only, done as a parody of haiku journals.
Makoto Ueda, Light Verse from the Floating World: An Anthology of Premodern Japanese Senryu, Columbia University Press, 1999.  cloth 
Michael Dylan Welch, ed. Fig Newtons: Senryu to Go, Press Here, 1993 (the first anthology of English-language )

External links

'A Brief Survey of Senryû by Women' by Hiroaki Sato in Modern Haiku, Volume 34.1, Spring 2003

Japanese poetry
Japanese literary terminology
Haikai forms
Articles containing Japanese poems
Japanese words and phrases